Dolichoderus voraginosus is a species of ant in the genus Dolichoderus. Described by Mackay in 1993, the species is endemic to Brazil.

References

Dolichoderus
Hymenoptera of South America
Insects described in 1993
Endemic fauna of Colombia